Forsnes is a village in the municipality of Hitra in Trøndelag county, Norway. It is located on the southwestern corner of the island of Hitra, along the Trondheimsleia. The population of the village is about 80.

In 1961, Forsnes was connected to the nearby city of Kristiansund by ferry, the first regular ferry connection to the island.  The ferry was discontinued in the fall of 2008 after a short trial period as a summer only route.

Forsnes Chapel is the oldest wooden church on the island of Hitra, dating back to 1763.

References

Hitra
Villages in Trøndelag